Wakari Hospital is a psychiatric hospital located in Dunedin, New Zealand.

It is situated in the suburb of Wakari, about three kilometres north-west of the city centre. The hospital is operated by the Southern District Health Board (formerly Otago District Health Board) and is closely associated with Dunedin Hospital.

It contains specialised psychiatric services but also cares for people with intellectual disability and people undergoing physical rehabilitation. It has units for forensic psychiatry, psychiatric emergency services, long- and short-term secure psychiatric units, Māori mental health, physical rehabilitation and increasingly community out-reach services such as public health and district nursing.

History 
From 1915 the site was initially an infectious diseases centre, and later a sanatorium. In 1957 it was redeveloped as a general hospital, serving as the main Otago hospital while the Dunedin Hospital was being redeveloped in the 1970s. In the early 1980s, the Nurses' home was leased to the University for use as a student hostel, this being taken back with the closure of the Cherry Farm Hospital in 1992.

Changing uses 
Wakari continued as a geriatric and psychiatric care facility, the geriatric wards gradually being wound down through the nineties with government reforms to privatise long-term care. The care of the elderly assessment and rehabilitation wards were transferred back to Dunedin Hospital. Attempts were made to sell the main block of the hospital, which found occasional use as a facility for live-in drug trials and even a temporary accommodation during important rugby tests.

Current directions 
Currently the main block is being redeveloped to house a variety of out-reach services such as Public Health and District Nursing, moving out of expensive leased premises and centralising in properties the Southern District Health Board already owns. Continuing consideration is being given to whether all the site needs to be retained and it has been proposed that some more land be sold to Leslie Groves Hospital.

References

External links
Southern District Health Board

Hospital buildings completed in 1915
Psychiatric hospitals in New Zealand
Buildings and structures in Dunedin
Hospitals established in 1915
Tuberculosis sanatoria